"Wear Your Love Like Heaven" is a song and US single by British singer-songwriter Donovan, released in 1967. It became the opening title of his 1967 double-disc album A Gift from a Flower to a Garden. It peaked at No. 23 in the Billboard Hot 100.

The song mentions seven dye and pigment colours: Prussian blue, scarlet, crimson, Havana lake, rose carmethene, alizarin crimson and carmine.

According to Billboard, the single has a "vital lyric message backed by a solid dance beat".  Cash Box said that it has "a message of love that should prove itself one of the chanter’s brightest sellers" and that the "easy-going steady beat lacks the basic drive of 'There Is A Mountain' but puts far more melodic beauty in this side."

Covers  

Eartha Kitt, on her 1970 album Sentimental.
They Might Be Giants, as a spoken word piece.
Sarah McLachlan, for the Donovan tribute album Island of Circles; it also appeared on US printings of her 1991 album Solace.
 Japanese noise artist Masonna perform a noise "cover" of this song on Japanese/American Noise Treaty compilation.
Peggy Lipton, in a 1970 single that appeared in the Record World "Non-Rock" Top 40.
A track from Richie Havens' 1969 album, Richard P. Havens, 1983.
Guy Davis, son of Ruby Dee and Ossie Davis, included the song on his 2015 album Kokomo Kidd.

Appearances in other media  
The song was featured in commercials for Menley & James' Love Cosmetics line in the late 1960s and early 1970s, including an Eau De Love fragrance commercial that featured Ali MacGraw.

It was featured in Season 13 The Simpsons episode "Weekend at Burnsie's" where Homer Simpson (after he smokes medicinal marijuana) gets ready for work and pictures his world as a psychedelic wonderland.

Definition of Sound's "Wear Your Love Like Heaven", a UK Top 20 hit in 1991, is a different song with the same title, but contains samples from the Donovan track.

References

External links
 

Songs written by Donovan
Donovan songs
1967 singles
Song recordings produced by Mickie Most
Psychedelic pop songs
Eartha Kitt songs
1967 songs
Epic Records singles